Benndale is a census-designated place (CDP)  and unincorporated community in George County, Mississippi, near the intersection of State Highways 26 (MS 26) and 57 (MS 57). It is part of the Pascagoula Metropolitan Statistical Area. Prior to the creation of George County, Benndale was located in Jackson County.
It became a CDP in the 2020 United States census, with a population of 65.

Background
Benndale Elementary School, a K-6 campus that is part of the George County School District, serves Benndale and surrounding areas.

A post office operated under the name Benndale from 1900 to 1967.

The Farnworth Lumber Company once operated a lumber camp in Benndale.

The Benndale soil series is named for the community.

2020 demographics

References

Unincorporated communities in George County, Mississippi
Unincorporated communities in Mississippi
Unincorporated communities in Pascagoula metropolitan area
Census-designated places in George County, Mississippi